Popular Action Party may refer to:

 Popular Action (Peru), a populist political party in Peru
 Popular Action Party (Panama), a Panamanian political party